The 1892 South Australian Football Association season was the 16th season of the top-level Australian rules football competition in South Australia.

Ladder

References 

SANFL
South Australian National Football League seasons